Euphaedra viridicaerulea, the brown-patch Ceres forester, is a butterfly in the family Nymphalidae. It is found in Nigeria, Cameroon, Gabon, the Democratic Republic of the Congo, the Central African Republic, Uganda and Kenya.

Subspecies
E. v. viridicaerulea (south-eastern Nigeria, Cameroon)
E. v. inanoides Holland, 1920 (Central African Republic, central and northern Democratic Republic of the Congo)
E. v. griseargentina Hecq, 1977 (southern Democratic Republic of the Congo)
E. v. nitidula van Someren, 1935 (Uganda, Kenya)

Description
 
E. viridicaerulea Bartel (= rana Stgr. i.1.) (44 c) differs from ceres in having the black discal spots on the under surface very indistinct or absent and from the following species in the distinct, black, bluish-margined submarginal spots on the hindwing beneath. The forewing has the subapical band bluish white and 
the hinclmarginal spot on the upper surface very narrow, scarcely reaching the middle of cellule 1 b; the marginal band on the upperside of the hind wing is without distinct blue spots; the forewing beneath has three black spots in the cell and a black submarginal spot in cellule 1 b; the hindwing beneath is more or less yellowish. especially towards the inner margin, in the cell with 1 or 2 black dots and with a black spot at the base of vein 8; the female with an indistinctly defined whitish median band, which is entirely absent in the male. South Cameroons and Gaboon.

Similar species
Other members of the Euphaedra ceres species group

References

Butterflies described in 1905
viridicaerulea